Mark Christopher Carlson (born July 11, 1969) is an American umpire in Major League Baseball. He wore number 48 until the 2012 season, when his number changed to 6. He was promoted to crew chief for the 2021 season.

Umpiring career
Carlson had previously worked in the Pioneer, Midwest, Florida State, Southern, International, and Arizona Fall leagues before reaching the MLB. Carlson has umpired the Division Series (2005, 2007, 2011, 2012, 2015, 2020, 2022), League Championship Series (2013, 2014, 2017, 2018, 2019, 2021) and World Series (2015, 2020).

Carlson was the left field umpire in the 2003 All-Star Game.

He was the home plate umpire for the May 2, 2012 no-hitter thrown by Los Angeles Angels pitcher Jered Weaver.

He was the second base umpire on September 28, 2012, when Homer Bailey of the Cincinnati Reds no-hit the Pittsburgh Pirates.

MLB selected Carlson to officiate the 2014 Opening Series from March 20–23, 2014 at the Sydney Cricket Ground in Sydney, Australia.

Personal life
Carlson was involved in baseball throughout his childhood. 
Carlson attended Joliet West High School and Parkland College, where he played catcher. He also served in the United States Marine Corps and served as a board member for UMPS Care Charities before founding the Mark Carlson's Care children's charity. He resides in Illinois with his wife and two daughters.

See also 

 List of Major League Baseball umpires

References

External links
MLB.com profile
Retrosheet
The Baseball Cube
Umpire Ejection Fantasy League Profile

1969 births
Living people
Sportspeople from Joliet, Illinois
Major League Baseball umpires
Parkland Cobras baseball players
Parkland College alumni
United States Marines